Gary Stevens (born 4 January 1944) is an Australian former rugby league footballer, a hard tackling second-row forward, of the 1960s and 1970s for the South Sydney Rabbitohs, Canterbury Bankstown Bulldogs and the Australian national representative side. He is the grandson of Souths club great Arthur Oxford.

Club career
Stevens played 163 games with South Sydney between 1965 and 1976, scoring 12 tries. He played in the 1970 and 1971 victorious  Rabbitohs Grand Final teams. A Souths junior, he was promoted to grade in 1964. He eventually captained Souths in 1976.

At the end of the 1976 season Stevens joined Canterbury-Bankstown with whom he played 26 games in 1977 and 1978.

Representative career
Stevens represented for Australia in five Test matches (1972–1975) and appeared six times for New South Wales (1972–1975). Stevens went on to play in the 1972 Australian World Cup campaign before touring Great Britain with the victorious 1973 Australian Kangaroos. He played against France in 1973 before representing Australia in two tests against the touring Great Britain side in 1974. The following year he was also selected in Australia's World Cup squad.

References

Sources
Canterbury Bulldogs profile
 The Encyclopaedia of Rugby League Players - South Sydney Rabbitohs, Alan Whiticker & Glen Hudson, Bas Publishing, 2005.

1944 births
Australian rugby league players
South Sydney Rabbitohs players
Canterbury-Bankstown Bulldogs players
Australia national rugby league team players
South Sydney Rabbitohs captains
Living people
Rugby league second-rows
Rugby league players from Sydney